The Embassy of Norway in Washington, D.C. is the diplomatic mission of the Kingdom of Norway to the United States. 

It is presently located at 2720 34th St., NW, Washington DC 20008. The Embassy in Washington, D.C. is Norway's largest, with a staff of approximately 50, including representatives from a number of Norwegian ministries.

The Ambassador is Anniken R. Krutnes.

History 
Norway established an embassy in the United States in 1906, a year after Norwegian independence from Sweden. 

The current chancery was built in 1977. Fentress Architects conducted a major renovation and expansion of the complex, incorporating various new features such as a new copper-clad timber hull and various sustainability upgrades, that was completed in May 2022.

Norwegian Consulates in the United States 
The Embassy also operates consulates general in Houston, New York City, and San Francisco.  In addition, there are 38 Norwegian honorary consulates around the United States.

See also 
 Statue of Crown Princess Märtha
 Norway–United States relations
 Foreign relations of Norway
 Foreign relations of the United States

References

External links
Official website
Norway and the United States  at the Embassy Website
Visitor’s visa and residence permit to Norway at the Embassy Website
wikimapia

Norway
Washington, D.C.
Norway–United States relations
Norway